The South Orkney Islands are a group of islands in the Southern Ocean, about  north-east of the tip of the Antarctic Peninsula and  south-west of South Georgia Island. The islands are claimed both by Britain (as part of the British Antarctic Territory since 1962, previously as a Falkland Islands Dependency), and by Argentina as part of Argentine Antarctica. Under the 1959 Antarctic Treaty, sovereignty claims are held in abeyance.

Britain and Argentina both maintain bases on the islands. The Argentine base, Orcadas, established 1904, is sited on Laurie Island. The 11 buildings of the Argentine station house up to 45 people during the summer, and an average of 14 during winter. The British Antarctic Survey base, Signy Research Station, is located on Signy Island and was established in 1947. Initially operated year-round, since 1995/6 the Signy Research Station has been open only from November to April each year (southern hemisphere summer).

Apart from personnel at the bases, there are no permanent inhabitants on the islands.

History

The South Orkney Islands were discovered in 1821 by two sealers, the American Nathaniel Brown Palmer and the Briton George Powell. The islands were originally named Powell's Group, with the main island named Coronation Island as it was the year of the coronation of King George IV. In 1823, James Weddell visited the islands, gave the archipelago its present name (after the Orkney Islands in the north of Scotland) and also renamed some of the islands. The South Orkney Islands are located at roughly the same latitude south as the Orkney Islands are north (60°S vs 59°N), although it is not known if this was a factor behind the naming of the islands. Similarly the South Shetland Islands, discovered in 1819 by William Smith, are roughly the same latitude south as the Shetland Islands are north (62°S vs 60°N).

Subsequently, the South Orkney Islands were frequently visited by sealers and whalers, but no thorough survey was done until the expedition of William Speirs Bruce on the Scotia in 1903, which overwintered at Laurie Island. Bruce surveyed the islands, reverted some of Weddell's name changes, and established a meteorological station, which was sold to the Argentine Government upon his departure in 1904. This base, renamed Orcadas in 1951, is still in operation  and is thus the oldest research station continuously staffed in the Antarctic.

In 1908, the United Kingdom declared sovereignty over various Antarctic and South American territories "to the south of the 50th parallel of south latitude, and lying between the 20th and the 80th degrees of west longitude", including the South Orkney Islands. The Islands were subsequently administered as part of the Falkland Islands Dependencies. A biological research station on Signy Island was built in 1947 by the British Antarctic Survey, and was staffed year-round until 1996, when the Station staffing was reduced to 8–10 personnel who remained only during the southern hemisphere summer (November to April each year). In 1962, the islands became part of the newly established British Antarctic Territory.

The Argentine claim to the islands dates from 1925. It was originally justified by the Argentine occupation of the Laurie Island base and later subsumed into a wider territorial claim.

Geography and climate

The islands are situated at latitudes about 60°30' to 60°48' S and longitudes 44°25' to 46°43' W in the Southern Ocean.

The archipelago comprises four main islands. Laurie Island is the easternmost of the islands. The other main islands are Powell and Signy. Smaller islands in the group include Robertson Islands, the Saddle Islands, and Acuña Island.

The climate of the South Orkneys is generally cold, wet, and windy. The seas around the islands are ice-covered from late April to November.

South Orkney Trough is an undersea trough named in association with the South Orkney Islands and approved 10/77 (ACUF 177).

Flora and fauna
Despite the harsh conditions, the islands do support vegetation and constitute the South Orkney Islands tundra ecoregion. All islands lie in the cold seas below the Antarctic convergence. These areas support tundra vegetation consisting of mosses, lichens and algae, while seabirds, penguins and seals feed in the surrounding waters.

The littoral zone of the South Orkneys is biologically either lifeless or very poor.  Amphipods and planarians exist under rocks, along with various algaes, chitons, and some gastropods.  With increasing water depth, life becomes more varied: starfish appear beyond 2–3 metres along with sponges, urchins, and ascidians.  At 8–10 metres the variety of starfish increases along with the general biomass, and below 30 metres there are vast colonies of these creatures. Two penguin species, Chinstrap (Pygoscelis antarctica) and Adélie (Pygoscelis adeliae), are present on land.

Research stations

The two claimant nations maintain research stations on the islands.
  Orcadas Base, Laurie Island (since 1904 – bought as a meteorological station from British scientist William Speirs Bruce in 1904)
  Signy Research Station, Signy Island (since 1947)

See also

References

External links

 Description of Bruce's expedition
 Images
 Argentine Government Website with a map of the South Orkney Islands

 
Islands of Antarctica
Archipelagoes of the Southern Ocean
British Antarctic Territory
Argentine Antarctica
Disputed islands
Archipelagoes of Argentina
Seal hunting